Independent National Party can refer to:

Independent National Party (Luxembourg), political party in Luxembourg
Greenback Party, political party in the United States
Independent National Party (Uruguay), a defunct Uruguayan political party

See also
National Independent Party (disambiguation) 
National Rally of Independents, political party in Morocco